"Memphis, Tennessee", sometimes shortened to "Memphis", is a song by Chuck Berry, first released in 1959. In the UK, the song charted at number 6 in 1963; at the same time Decca Records issued a cover version in the UK by Dave Berry and the Cruisers, which also became a UK Top 20 hit single. Johnny Rivers's version of the song was a number two US hit in 1964.

Background
In the song the narrator is speaking to a long-distance operator, trying to find out the number of a girl named Marie, who lives in Memphis, Tennessee, "on the southside, high upon a ridge, just a half a mile from the Mississippi bridge." The narrator offers little information to the operator at first, only that he misses Marie and that they were separated by Marie's mother. The final verse reveals that Marie is, in fact, the narrator's six-year-old daughter; her mother, presumably the narrator's ex-wife, "tore apart our happy home" because she "did not agree", as it turned out, with their marriage, not his relationship with Marie, as the listener was misdirected to assume. This song was recorded in St. Louis at Chuck Berry's home, in July 1958.
 Chuck Berry – vocals, guitar, guitar overdubs, electric bass
 Jasper Thomas – drums
The song was released as Chess single 1729.

Chuck Berry later composed a sequel, "Little Marie", which appeared in 1964 as a single and on the album St. Louis to Liverpool.

Beatles versions 
The Beatles recorded five versions of "Memphis, Tennessee", for BBC Radio. One version that was recorded on July 30, 1963, for the Pop Go The Beatles radio show was included on Live at the BBC in 1994. Another version that was recorded a few months later on October 5, 1963, for the Saturday Club radio show was included on On Air – Live at the BBC Volume 2 in 2013.

The group first performed it for their failed Decca audition on January 1, 1962, with Pete Best on drums.

John Lennon and his wife Yoko Ono would later perform the song with Berry on an episode of The Mike Douglas Show, aired on February 16, 1972. The episode was part of a series of five episodes of the show featuring performances from Lennon and Ono. During the performance of "Memphis, Tennessee", Ono attempted to add her own wailing vocalizations to the song, visibly irritating Berry and Lennon; eventually, technicians disconnected Ono's microphone for the remainder of the performance. This infamous rendition of the song would later become the subject of a skit by Bill Burr.

Personnel 
 John Lennon – vocals, rhythm guitar
 Paul McCartney – bass guitar
 George Harrison – lead guitar
 Ringo Starr – drums

Other popular versions 

In 1963, guitarist Lonnie Mack recorded a fast-paced instrumental version, which he called "Memphis". It went to number 5 on Billboard Pop chart and number 4 on Billboard R&B chart.

In 1964 singer Johnny Rivers recorded another version of the tune (which he, following Mack, called "Memphis"), copying Mack's pacing and some of his instrumental improvisations, and reinstating the vocal line from Berry's original. This version hit number 2 on Billboard Pop chart.

In 1981, country singer-songwriter Fred Knoblock recorded his rendition of "Memphis". It went to number 10 on Billboard Country chart and number 28 on Billboard Adult Contemporary chart.

Chart history

Weekly charts
Chuck Berry

Dave Berry & the Cruisers

Lonnie Mack

Johnny Rivers

Fred Knoblock

Year-end charts

Notable covers
The song has been covered over 200 times by musical artists. The most notable examples include Bernd Spier who hit number 1 in 1964 in Germany.

References

Chuck Berry songs
1959 singles
The Beatles songs
Jan and Dean songs
1963 singles
1964 singles
American songs
Chess Records singles
Elvis Presley songs
Imperial Records singles
Johnny Rivers songs
Gene Summers songs
The Animals songs
Paul Anka songs
Conway Twitty songs
The Dave Clark Five songs
Dave Berry (musician) songs
Bo Diddley songs
Tom Jones (singer) songs
Jerry Lee Lewis songs
Roy Orbison songs
The Rolling Stones songs
Fred Knoblock songs
Number-one singles in Germany
Songs about Memphis, Tennessee
Songs about telephone calls
Songs written by Chuck Berry
Song recordings produced by George Martin
RPM Top Singles number-one singles
1959 songs